Ketupat (in Indonesian and Malay), or kupat (in Javanese and Sundanese),  or tipat (in Balinese) is a Javanese rice cake packed inside a diamond-shaped container of woven palm leaf pouch, Originating in Indonesia, it is also found in Brunei, Malaysia, Singapore and southern Thailand. It is commonly described as "packed rice", although there are other types of similar packed rice such as lontong and bakchang.

Ketupat is cut open and its skin (woven palm leaf) removed. The inner rice cake is cut in pieces and served as a staple food in place of plain steamed rice. It is usually eaten with rendang, opor ayam, sayur labu (chayote soup), or sambal goreng hati (liver in sambal), or served as an accompaniment to satay (chicken or red meat in skewers) or gado-gado (mixed vegetables with peanut sauce). Ketupat is also the main element of certain dishes such as ketupat sayur (ketupat in chayote soup with tofu and boiled egg) and kupat tahu (ketupat and tofu in peanut sauce).

Ketupat is related to similar dishes in other rice-farming Austronesian cultures, like the Filipino puso or Patupat, although the latter is not restricted to diamond shapes and traditionally come in various intricately woven designs ranging from star-like to animal-shaped. An octahedron-shaped version called katupat was also found in pre-colonial Guam and the Mariana Islands, before the ancient rice cultivation in the island was replaced by maize brought by the Spanish.

History

The use of woven young palm leaves (janur) fronds as a pouch to cook food is widespread in Maritime Southeast Asia, from Java, Indonesia to Malaysia, Singapore, and the Philippines. Ketupat is made from rice that has been wrapped in a woven palm leaf pouch and boiled. As the rice cooks, the grains expand to fill the pouch and the rice becomes compressed. This method of cooking gives the ketupat its characteristic form and texture of a rice cake. 

Ketupat was first introduced by an Indonesian theologian named Sunan Kalijaga who was an important figure for Muslims in Java. In Java and most of Indonesia, ketupat is linked to Islamic tradition of lebaran (Eid ul-Fitr). The earliest connection of ketupat with Islamic lebaran tradition is believed to be originated in 15th-century Sultanate of Demak.

According to Javanese traditions, the Indonesian lebaran tradition was first started when Sunan Bonang, one of Wali Songo of Tuban in 15th-century Java, calls for the Muslims to elevate the perfection of their Ramadhan fast by asking forgiveness and forgiving others' wrongdoings. The tradition on preparing and consuming ketupat or kupat in Javanese language during lebaran was introduced by Raden Mas Sahid or Sunan Kalijaga, one of Wali Songo (nine Muslim saints) that spread Islam in Java. Sunan Kalijaga introduced the lebaran ketupat ritual on 8 Shawwal, a week after Eid ul-Fitr and a day after a six-day Shawwal fast. It is believed that it contains appropriate symbolism; kupat means ngaku lepat or "admitting one's mistakes" in Javanese language, in accordance to asking for forgiveness tradition during lebaran. The crossed weaving of palm leaves symbolises mistakes and sins committed by human beings, and the inner whitish rice cake symbolise purity and deliverance from sins after observing Ramadhan fast, prayer and rituals. 

Other than Java, the tradition on consuming ketupat during Eid ul-Fitr is also can be found throughout Indonesia; from Sumatra, Kalimantan, Sulawesi, Nusa Tenggara, and also neighboring countries, including Malaysia, Singapore and Brunei. ketupat has also been used as "sajen" (an offering for dead ancestors) for centuries. People hang a bunch of ketupat (usually "banten" style) at the door to treat the spirit of the ancestors they believe would come back to visit. 

Local stories passed down through the generations have attributed the creation of this style of rice preparation to the seafarers' need to keep cooked rice from spoiling during long sea voyages. The coco leaves used in wrapping the rice are always shaped into a triangular or diamond form and stored hanging in bunches in the open air. The shape of the package facilitates moisture to drip away from the cooked rice while the coco leaves allow the rice to be aerated and at the same time prevent flies and insects from touching it.

Despite its current association with Muslim festival of lebaran, ketupat is also known in non-Muslim communities, such as Hindu Balinese and people of the Philippines, which suggested that the weaving of coconut fronds has pre-Islamic origin. It was linked to the local Hindu ritual on venerating Dewi Sri, the Javanese goddess of rice. The Balinese Hindus still weaved the Cili fronds effigy of Dewi Sri as an offering, as well as weaving tipat fronds during Kuningan Balinese Hindu holy day.

Cultural significance

In various places in Indonesia, there is a ceremony called Lebaran Ketupat, which is observed after the conclusion of an extra six days of fasting following Idul Fitri. In Lombok, West Nusa Tenggara, thousands of Muslims celebrated Lebaran Ketupat—or Lebaran Topat as it is locally called—by visiting the graves of Muslim ulamas before partaking in communal ceremonial activities, which includes music performances, ketupat cooking competitions, to shared meals where ketupat was served as the main dish. Side dishes at the events varied, ranging from plecing kangkung (stir-fried water spinach) to the local dish of Ayam Taliwang. 

In Central Java, Lebaran Ketupat is called Bada Kupat, and was celebrated by cooking and serving ketupat and lepet (steamed sticky rice cooked in plaited palm leaves) in Semarang. In Colo, Kudus Regency, a parade of gunungan (cone-shape offering) made of ketupat, lepet and other food items on the slope of Mount Muria near the grave of noted Muslim preacher Sunan Muria, was held to celebrate Bada Kupat, while on the slope of Mount Merapi in Boyolali Regency, the celebration featured a parade of livestock decorated with ketupat.

Among Hindu communities in Bali and Banyuwangi in East Java, ketupat is part of the offering and ritual of Kuningan festive celebration to conclude the Galungan holy days. During Galungan, Hindu families create and erect a penjor pole made of janur (young palm leaves), and then make some offerings to the Pura. Ten days after Galungan, the ceremony of Kuningan is observed to conclude the religious holy days. To celebrate Kuningan, Balinese Hindu families make tipat or ketupat first as offering, and then they consume some ketupat afterwards.

There are some striking similarities between Javanese Muslim Lebaran and Balinese Hindu Galungan-Kuningan holy days, of which ketupat is one. For example, the families pay a visit to the grave of their family or ancestors prior of observing the holy day, and they consume ketupat to conclude the religious festival. Although today in contemporary Indonesia, ketupat is strongly associated with Muslim celebration of Idul Fitri, this parallel phenomenon suggested the pre-Islamic native origin of ketupat, as Native Indonesian ways to shows gratitude and to celebrate festivities by making and consuming certain kind of food.

Varieties

There are many varieties of ketupat, with two of the more common ones being ketupat nasi and ketupat pulut. Ketupat nasi is made from common white rice and is wrapped in a square shape with coconut palm leaves while ketupat pulut is made from glutinous rice is usually wrapped in a triangular shape using the leaves of the fan palm (Licuala). Ketupat pulut is also called ketupat daun palas in Malaysia, primarily found in northern Malay Peninsula and among the Malay community of southern Thailand. Usually ketupat pouch are made from janur or young palm leaves fronds. However, in Kalimantan, nipah leaves might be used and woven into ketupat as well.

Ketupat is also traditionally served by Indonesian and Malays at open houses on festive occasions such as lebaran or Idul Fitri (Hari Raya Aidilfitri). During Idul Fitri in Indonesia, ketupat is often served with either opor ayam (chicken in coconut milk), chicken or beef curry, rendang, sambal goreng ati (spicy beef liver), krechek (buffalo or beef skin dish), or sayur labu Siam (chayote soup). Ketupat or lontong is also used as the replacement of plain steamed rice in gado-gado, karedok, or pecel.

Derivative dishes
Other than replacing steamed rice or lontong in certain dishes, such as satay, gado-gado, and ketoprak, ketupat is also forming the essential part of other derivative dishes with certain recipes developed from it.

Ketupat sayur

One of popular street food in Indonesian cities is Ketupat sayur which literary means "ketupat in vegetables soup". Ketupat sayur is known in two popular versions; the Betawi version from Jakarta and katupek sayua the Padang version from West Sumatra. Ketupat sayur is popular as breakfast fare in Jakarta and Padang. It consist of ketupat served with sliced labu siam (chayote) and unripe jackfruit gulai in thin and spicy coconut milk soup, topped with cooked tofu and telur pindang (spiced boiled egg), and krupuk crackers. The Padang or Minangkabau version might be served with additional dishes, such as egg balado, rendang and various gulai. If lontong was used in the identical recipe, it is called lontong sayur instead.

Kupat tahu

Ketupat also used as main ingredient in Sundanese and Javanese dish kupat tahu, which is ketupat, tahu goreng (fried tofu), and bean sprouts served in peanut sauce topped with crispy krupuk crackers. Popular variants of kupat tahu includes Kupat tahu Kuningan from Kuningan Regency in West Java, Kupat Tahu Padalarang from Padalarang, West Bandung, Kupat Tahu Magelang from Magelang Regency, Central Java, and Kupat tahu Gempol from Surabaya, East Java.

Tipat cantok

Its Balinese version is called tipat cantok, which is sliced ketupat with boiled or blanched vegetables; asparagus bean, water spinach, bean sprout, cucumber, and fried tofu mixed in peanut sauce which is made from ground fried peanuts, garlic, chili pepper, salt and tauco fermented soy paste. The peanut sauce might be mild or hot and spicy, depends on the addition of chili pepper. It is one of a few Balinese vegetarian dish. Tipat cantok is akin to Javanese pecel and Jakartan gado-gado.

Other uses

In Hindu-majority Bali, ketupat is used as one of the temple offerings. In Java, among traditional Muslim abangan community, the woven empty or uncooked ketupat skin is often hung as an amulet to symbolise wealth and prosperity.

Because in Indonesia, Malaysia, southern Thailand, Singapore and Brunei ketupat is strongly linked to Islamic Eid ul-Fitr, it is also used there as decorations. The empty ketupat skin woven from colourful ribbons are used as decorations to signify this festive occasions, in the same fashions as bells to signify Christmas. Colorful ribbon ketupat are often used to decorate shopping malls, offices, or as decorations of gift parcels.

Similar dishes

In the Philippines, similar rice pouches are known as puso (literally "heart") and had their origins from pre-colonial animistic ritual offerings as recorded by Spanish historians. Unlike ketupat, however, they are not restricted to diamond shapes and can come in a wide variety of weaving styles which still survive among various ethnic groups in the Philippines today. Ketupat are also woven differently, the leaf base and the loose leaf strands do not exit at the same point, as in most Filipino puso. Ketupat somewhat resemble the tamu pinad version among Muslim Filipinos the most, which are shaped like a flattened diamond, although they are also woven differently. Patupat, a delicacy common in the northern provinces of the Philippines, despite having the same form, is cooked differently. Patupat is cooked in sugarcane juice.

In Cambodia, a similar dish of pounded sticky rice wrapped in a pentagonal woven palm leaves is called katom (កាតំ) in Khmer. It is a non-traditional variant of num kom which uses banana leaves instead of palm. In Indonesia, similar dish of compressed rice in leaf container includes lepet, lontong, lemper, arem-arem and bacang.

In China, there is a similar dish called lap (苙) that is a local speciality of the island of Hainan. Hainanese lap is usually bigger in size than Indonesia's ketupat. Lap skin might be woven into pillow-shaped or triangular, the sticky rice is filled with pork belly. Outside China, lap can also can be found in Port Dickson in Malaysia and Singapore.

See also

 Binalot
 Burasa
 Lamban
 Lemang
 Lemper
 Lepet
 Lontong
 Onigiri
 Pastil
 Zongzi

References

Bruneian cuisine
Indonesian rice dishes
Malay cuisine
Malaysian cuisine
Singaporean cuisine
Southeast Asian cuisine
Thai cuisine
Cocossian cuisine
Glutinous rice dishes
Vegetarian dishes of Indonesia
Holiday foods